The King Salmon Fault is a northwest-trending thrust fault in the Northern Interior of British Columbia, Canada. It takes its name from King Salmon Lake which lies at the headwaters of King Salmon Creek.

References

Thrust faults
Geology of British Columbia